Revesby Abbey was a Cistercian monastery near the village of Revesby in Lincolnshire, England.  The abbey was founded in 1143 by William de Roumare, Earl of Lincoln, and the first monks came from Rievaulx Abbey.

After the Dissolution of the Monasteries in the 16th century, the Abbey was demolished and a country house built. The current house was built in the mid-19th century, but is in poor condition. Unoccupied since the 1960s and previously earmarked for demolition, the house is currently listed on the English Heritage "At Risk" register, but says there is a "repair scheme in progress and (where applicable) end use or user identified".

History
Revesby Abbey was founded in 1142 by William de Roumare, Earl of Lincoln, who became a monk at the abbey in his later life, and was then buried within the abbey. The first monks at the abbey were sent from Rievaulx Abbey in Yorkshire. The abbey was endowed with land at Revesby, Scithesby and Thoresby, and with the advowsons of the churches of Hagnaby and Scithesby.

During the mid-12th century, the monks of Revesby offered land in other villages to its tenants in the villages of Stichesby and Thoresby, if they would move. All 13 families left Stichesby and all 11 from Thoresby, leaving both of these settlements unpopulated.

In the 14th century the abbey acquired the manor of Mareham and was granted permission to hold a weekly market and an annual fair there.

In 1534 the abbey was recorded as having an income of £1287 2s. 4½d., and was in control of the manors of Claxby, East Keal, Hagnaby, Hameringham, Mareham-le-Fen, Mavis Enderby, Sibsey, Stickney and Toynton. However, despite this, the abbey's income appears to have been mismanaged, and in 1538 the Duke of Norfolk wrote to Thomas Cromwell to inform him the abbey was "in great ruin and decay".

The abbey was dissolved c.1539.

Abbots of Revesby Abbey
List of known Abbots of Revesby Abbey:

William, first abbot, 1142
Walo, occurs 1155
Hugh, occurs 1176 and 1200
Ralf, occurs 1208
Elias, occurs 1216 and 1231
Matthew
William, occurs 1255
Walter, occurs 1257 and 1263
Robert, occurs 1275
Henry, occurs 1291
Walter, elected 1294
Philip, occurs 1294
Henry, elected 1301, occurs 1314
Henry, occurs 1385
John de Toft, occurs 1390
Philip Malteby, occurs 1415
Thomas, (Stickney) occurs 1504-32
Robert Styk or Banbury, occurs 1536
John, occurs 1537

Burials
Hawise de Reviers, sister of Baldwin de Redvers, 1st Earl of Devon (Reviers)
William (Helie) de Roumare, 2nd Earl of Lincoln

History after Dissolution
After dissolution the former abbey passed through various hands. It was in the hands of Charles Brandon, 1st Duke of Suffolk, at the time of his death in 1545. From Brandon it passed to John Carsley and then to his son Francis Carsley. The former monastic estate was sold to William Cecil, 1st Baron Burghley, in 1575. It then passed through his family to his son: the 1st Earl of Exeter; and grandson: the 2nd Earl of Exeter. Through the marriage of the 2nd Earl's daughter, Lady Elizabeth Cecil, the estate passed to Thomas Howard, 1st Earl of Berkshire, and then to their third son, Henry Howard (a playwright). Following Henry's death, the estate passed to his nephew Craven Howard (d.1700; son of Henry's brother Thomas and father of Henry Howard, 11th Earl of Suffolk).

Country House
The site of the former Abbey was, like many others, developed into a country house.

Craven Howard (d.1700) built a new residential house at the former Abbey, although not on top of the former monastic remains. This new house and estate passed to Craven's son Henry Howard, 11th Earl of Suffolk.

In 1711 Henry sold the house and 2,000-acre estate for £14,000. The purchaser was Joseph Banks I, who established his son Joseph Banks II at the house. Henry required a private Act of Parliament to sell the house, as it was tied to him and his children as "part of his marriage settlement". The purchase price was described as "evidently cheap", as the estate had an annual income of around £900. Revesby and the rest of Joseph Banks' possessions officially passed to his son with his death. Although Joseph II had lived primarily at Revesby during his father's lifetime, after his death, Joseph II spent little time there.

The grounds were extensively landscaped in the mid-18th century, and in the late 18th century the house was home to the botanist Sir Joseph Banks, who sailed with Captain Cook.

Current House
The current house called Revesby Abbey  was built in 1845 in the "Jacobethan" style, by architect William Burn, for James Banks Stanhope. It appears the house was totally built and furnished from scratch, as the contents of the previous house, including furniture, paintings and curtains, were auctioned in 1843. The timber, cornices and fittings were also auctioned in 1844. Although the sub-basement for the current house is built with bricks much older than the house and so it is believed are the bricks from Craven Howard's house.

The house is currently Grade I listed, currently on Historic England's Heritage at Risk Register as being in a 'very bad' state and is in immediate risk of further rapid deterioration.  Historic England says that the current owners have made progress with repairs to the stable block but the main house is still at risk. The house has been unoccupied since at least 1968 although the current owners live in the Stable block; its "remaining contents" were sold in 1953.

In 1977 permission was sought to demolish the house by the then owner Mrs Anne Lee; it was however, refused. She was also advised by the council to apply again, but did not.

In 1987 English Heritage used Section 101 of the 1971 Town and Country Planning Act to conduct "urgent works which the owner is unwilling to do". The Secretary of State had the power to reclaim the costs of the building work from Mrs Lee, and the following year the house was listed for sale. The house then passed through multiple hands until 1999, when the current owners bought the Abbey and have now made considerable progress to it.

The Revesby Abbey Preservation Trust was formed over 20 years ago but was shut down by trading standards; the new owners have "made progress".

Remains of the medieval abbey
Nothing of the abbey is visible today which was to the SW of the present house and the village of Revesby. Excavations undertaken in 1869 only located the abbey church and cloister. In 1870 the skeletons of several monks were found. Earthworks indicate the extent of the abbey precinct, and reveal the location of 3 rectangular fishponds.

References

Bibliography
The Cistercian Abbeys of Britain, ed David Robinson, Batsford 1998
A History of the County of Lincolnshire: Volume II, The Victoria County History 1906

External links

"The Abbey of Revesby"; British History Online ("Houses of Cistercian monks -  The abbey of Revesby'", A History of the County of Lincoln: Volume 2, 1906, pp. 141–143). Retrieved 17 May 2012
"Revesby Abbey and Stable Yard, Revesby", British Listed Buildings. Retrieved 17 May 2012
www.revesbyabbey.co.uk Country House Restoration
 

Monasteries in Lincolnshire
Cistercian monasteries in England
Country houses in Lincolnshire
Religious organizations established in the 1140s
Grade I listed buildings in Lincolnshire
Christian monasteries established in the 12th century
1143 establishments in England
1538 disestablishments in England
Monasteries dissolved under the English Reformation